Broa ( or ) is a type of corn and rye bread traditionally made in Portugal, Galicia, Angola, Mozambique, Cape Verde and  Brazil, however in those countries it is more closely related to cornbread and its original recipe from Native Americans, where it is traditionally seasoned with fennel. Broa(mostly not in Brazil) is made from a mixture of cornmeal and rye or wheat flour, and is leavened with yeast rather than baking powder or baking soda.

The name "broa" comes from the Gothic or Suebian word brauth that means bread.

In Portugal, broa de milho is a type of broa listed on the Ark of Taste. This yeast bread has the rustic flavor and texture that suitably accompanies soups, especially caldo verde, a Portuguese soup made with tender kale, potatoes, and chouriço sausages.

In the Philippines, broa (or broas) traditionally refer to ladyfingers, and not to a type of cornbread. Additionally, in Guyana, broas are instead a style of sugar cookies (or biscuits), flavored with lime, cinnamon, and nutmeg.

See also
 List of maize dishes

References

Brazilian cuisine
Portuguese cuisine
Yeast breads
Maize dishes